Psibela was a town of ancient Lycaonia, inhabited in Roman and Byzantine times. It was renamed Verinopolis at some point between 457 and 479. It became a bishopric; no longer the seat of a residential bishop, it remains a titular see of the Roman Catholic Church.

Its site is unlocated, although Sir William Ramsay suggests a similarity with Sibyla, which is located in modern Yıldızköy.

References

Populated places in ancient Lycaonia
Catholic titular sees in Asia
Former populated places in Turkey
Roman towns and cities in Turkey
Populated places of the Byzantine Empire
Lost ancient cities and towns